Andrea Memmo (29 March 1729 – 27 January 1793) was a Venetian patrician and politician. Tutored by Carlo Lodoli, he was a proponent of Enlightenment values and political reform for the stagnant Republic of Venice. He is well known for his love affair with Giustiniana Wynne, following her to Milan and Paris, before returning to Venice. 

He became a member of the Venetian Senate, and governor of Padua in 1775–1776, during which time he initiated the construction of Prato della Valle. He later served as Bailo of Constantinople (1777), ambassador to the Holy See (1781), and was elevated to the post of procurator of Saint Mark (1785). In 1789, he was a candidate for the Dogeship, losing to Lodovico Manin. He was one of the first freemasons in Venice.

References

Sources
 
 

1729 births
1793 deaths
18th-century Venetian people
Baili of Constantinople
Procurators of Saint Mark
History of Padua